Malva trimestris (synonyms Althaea trimestris, Lavatera trimestris), common names annual mallow, rose mallow, royal mallow, regal mallow, and common annual tree mallow is a species of flowering plant native to the Mediterranean region.

The Latin trimestris literally means "of three months", referring to the growing and flowering period. 

This plant is widely cultivated, often under the name Lavatera trimestris. Numerous cultivars have been developed for garden use, all of which are annuals to be sown in spring for flowering the same year. The cultivars 'Beauty Series'  and 'Silver Cup' have gained the Royal Horticultural Society's Award of Garden Merit.

References

External links 
 Missouri Botanical Garden

trimestris
Annual plants
Flora of France
Flora of Algeria
Flora of Greece
Flora of Israel
Flora of Italy
Flora of Lebanon
Flora of Morocco
Flora of Portugal
Flora of Palestine (region)
Flora of Spain
Flora of Turkey
Garden plants of Africa
Garden plants of Asia
Garden plants of Europe
Garden plants
Plants described in 1796